Mary Elizabeth Chieffo (born November 7, 1992) is an American actress known for portraying the Klingon L'Rell on the television series Star Trek: Discovery.

Biography
Chieffo was born and grew up in the neighborhood of Valley Village, Los Angeles in California, only daughter of actors Michael Chieffo and Beth Grant. Her acting debut was at the age of three when she played a sleeping girl in Sandra Bullock's short film Making Sandwiches, in which her mother also had a role, and later acted in various TV shows and short and feature films. As a child, she attended Shakespeare theater camp at the Theatricum Botanicum, where she performed in a variety of shows including Antony and Cleopatra.

She attended the Drama division of Juilliard School in New York City, earning a Bachelor of Fine Arts degree in 2015. One of her classmates was future Star Trek: Discovery castmate Mary Wiseman. Her first high profile acting position was on Star Trek: Discovery, where she played the recurring character of L'Rell, a Klingon warrior and spy who becomes leader of the Klingon Empire at the end of Season 1. Her writing and producing debut was Operation Othello, a virtual reality adaptation of Shakespeare's Othello, where she also plays Lt. Iago in a gender twist from the original play. In 2022 she reprised her role as Iago in "Iago: The Green Eyed Monster", a 6-minute futuristic musical AR prequel to Othello, nominated for "Best Immersive Experience" in the 2022 Tribeca Festival.

Personal life
Chieffo came out publicly as a lesbian on the red carpet prior to the Star Trek Day event held September 8, 2021, at the Skirball Cultural Center in Los Angeles, California. A few days later, she confirmed via her Twitter feed that she was dating writer and actor Madi Goff.

Filmography

References

External links
 

1992 births
Living people
21st-century American actresses
Actresses from Los Angeles
American film actresses
American lesbian actresses
American television actresses
Juilliard School alumni
People from the San Fernando Valley